Vitaly Hurkou (born March 27, 1985), is a Belarusian welterweight Muay Thai kickboxer fighting out of Minsk for Patriot Gym.  He is a seven time amateur Muay Thai world champion and is the K-1 World MAX 2010 East Europe champion currently competing in Kunlun Fight. He is also the singer of the rock band Brutto.

Amateur career

Vitaly has been a prominent member of the Belarusian Muay Thai national team.  He won his first international tournament in his teens, winning gold at the 2001 I.F.M.A. European Championships.  He followed this up two years later aged just 17 by winning a gold medal in the 61 kg category at the 2003 I.A.M.T.F. World Championships in Bangkok, Thailand.  Between 2004 and 2008 Vitaly would win four gold medals at the W.M.F. world championships (2004, 2005, 2006, 2007) along with a gold medal at the 2004 W.K.P.F. World Championships and gold at the 2006 W.A.K.O. European Championships.

In 2008 Vitaly entered the 4th Busan TAFISA World Games in Busan, South Korea which was holding the 2008 I.F.M.A. World Championship.  He made the final but had to make do with silver – losing his final match to the Ukrainian Petr Nakonechnyi.  He returned with a vengeance the following year winning the 2009 I.F.M.A. European Championship and the 2009 I.F.M.A. World Championship.  At the world championship Vitaly defeated Marcus Öberg in the quarter finals before gaining his revenge on Nakonechnyi in the semi finals en route to winning gold.  At the I.F.M.A. world championships in 2010, Vitaly made it through to the final but lost in the gold medal match, although he would win gold earlier on in the year at the I.F.M.A. European Championships in Italy.  So far in his amateur career he has nine medals at World championships (seven gold, two silver) and three golds at European championships from 61 kg through to his current weight of 71 kg.

On July 30, 2017 Gurkov became the first 75 kg Muay Thai Gold-medalistat The World Games 2017 in Wroclaw, Poland.

Professional career

As a result of his successful amateur career, Gurkov has increasingly become involved in professional competitions. In 2007, he entered the W.M.C. Brute Force 8 Judgment Day - 72 kg tournament in Melbourne, Australia. Gurkov showed his amateur skills were not lost on the professional circuit, defeating Australian Greg Foley in the final to win the event. In 2008, he attempted to qualify for The Contender Asia Season 2 Muay Thai reality show in Chelyabinsk, Russia.  He defeated amateur rival Petr Nakonechnyi in the semi-finals but lost to reigning 75 kg I.M.F.A. World Champion Artem Levin by TKO in the final.  In 2009, he had more disappointment, losing in the final of the Tatneft Cup - 70 kg category.

In 2010, Gurkov made his mark on the professional circuit at the K-1 World MAX 2010 East Europe Tournament on March 19 in Minsk, Belarus.  He defeated his first two opponents by decision before facing Zamin Guseynov from Azerbaijan in the final.  After three rounds, Gurkov was crowned K-1 World MAX 2010 East Europe champion, defeating his opponent by unanimous decision. This victory meant that Gurkov qualified for kickboxing’s most prestigious competition at the forthcoming K-1 World MAX 2010 Final 16.  At the event, Gurkov was given the toughest draw, having to face reigning K-1 champion Giorgio Petrosyan in Seoul.  After three rounds, Vitaly failed to cause an upset, his K-1 MAX dream finished by a unanimous decision defeat.  A few weeks later, he was knocked out of another high-profile tournament, losing to Petchmankong Petchfocus in the second round of the Izuzu Thai Fight Muay Thai competition.

He beat Fares Bechar via decision in the quarter-finals of the 2012 Thai Fight 70 kg Tournament at Thai Fight 2012: King of Muay Thai in Bangkok, Thailand on October 23, 2012.

He then beat Antero Hynynen in the tournament semi-finals in Nakhon Ratchasima, Thailand on November 25, 2012.

He lost to Buakaw Banchamek in the final on December 16, 2012.

He defeated Kem Sitsongpeenong by decision to win the WBC Muaythai World Super Welterweight (-69.8 kg/154 lb) Championship at Ring Wars in Milan, Italy on January 25, 2014.

He was expected fight Tony Hervey at Kickboxing Empire II in Las Vegas, Nevada, United States on March 8, 2014, but Hervey was replaced with Jaseem Al Djilwi. Gurkov won by TKO in round three after barraging Al Djiwali with a knee to the body and subsequent unanswered follow-up punches in round three.

In 2017 Gurkov joined Banchamek Gym and had his first fight representing the camp at Kunlun Fight 62. He defeated Nurla Mulali of China by decision on June 10, 2017 in Bangkok, Thailand.

On November 5, 2017 Gurkov won eight-man 75 kg tournament at Kunlun Fight 66 in Wuhan, China. He defeated Chinese Nurla Mulali, Thai Arthit Hanchana, and Iranian Hossein Karami.

On July 27, 2019 Gurkov won the 75 kg tournament in Beijing, China to become the first athlete in the promotion to win the belt twice.

Titles and accomplishments

Professional
Kunlun Fight
 2019 Kunlun Fight 75kg Tournament Champion
 2017 Kunlun Fight 75kg Tournament Champion

World Boxing Council Muaythai
 2014 WBC World Super Welterweight (-69.8 kg/154 lb) Championship

K-1
 2010 K-1 World MAX East Europe Champion
Tatneft Cup
 2009 Tatneft Cup Runner Up

The Contender Asia
2008 Season 2 Russia Super 8 Qualifier Runner Up

World Muay Thai Council
 2007 W.M.C. Brute Force 8 Judgement Day Champion

AmateurWorld Games 2017 World Games in Wroclaw, Poland  -75 kg
 2013 World Games in Bangkok, Thailand  -71 kgInternational Federation of Muaythai Associations2014 I.F.M.A. European Championships in Krakow, Poland  -75 kg
2013 I.F.M.A. European Championships in Lisbon, Portugal  -71 kg
2012 I.F.M.A. World Championships in Saint-Petersburg, Russia  -71 kg
2012 I.F.M.A. European Championships in Antalya, Turkey  -71 kg
2011 I.F.M.A. World Championships in Tashkent, Uzbekistan  -71 kg
2010 I.F.M.A. World Championships in Bangkok, Thailand  -71 kg
2010 I.F.M.A. European Championships in Velletri, Italy  -71 kg
2009 I.F.M.A. World Championships in Bangkok, Thailand  -71 kg
2009 I.F.M.A. European Championships in Liepāja, Latvia  -71 kg
2008 I.F.M.A. World Championships in Bangkok, Thailand  -71 kg
2001 I.F.M.A. European Championships World Muaythai Federation2007 W.M.F. World Championships in Bangkok, Thailand  -71 kg
2006 W.M.F. World Championships in Bangkok, Thailand  -67 kg
2005 W.M.F. World Championships in Bangkok, Thailand 
2004 W.M.F. World Championships in Bangkok, Thailand World Association of Kickboxing Organizations2006 W.A.K.O. European Championships in Skopje, Macedonia  -67 kg (Thai-Boxing) 

2004 W.K.P.F. World Championships 
2003 I.A.M.T.F. World Championships in Bangkok, Thailand  -61 kg

Fight record

|-
|-  style="background:#CCFFCC;"
|  2019-07-27 || Win || align="left" | Saiyok Pumpanmuang || Kunlun Fight 81 75kg World Tournament (Finals ) || Beijing, China || Decision (Unanimous) || 3 || 3:00
|-
! style=background:white colspan=9 |
|-
|-  style="background:#CCFFCC;"
|  2019-07-27 || Win|| align="left" | Wu Sihan  || Kunlun Fight 81 75kg World Tournament (1/2 Finals ) || Beijing, China || KO (Body Punch)|| 2 || 3:00
|-
|-  style="background:#CCFFCC;"
|  2019-07-27 || Win|| align="left" | Yiliyasi || Kunlun Fight 81 75kg World Tournament (1/4 Finals ) || Beijing, China || Decision (Unanimous)  || 3 || 3:00
|-  bgcolor= "#FFBBBB"
| 2018-10-22|| Loss||align=left|  Mergen Bilyalov  ||kunlun Fight 78 75 kg Tournament, Semi Finals  || China || TKO (Right Hook to the Body) || 1 || 1:08
|-  style="background:#CCFFCC;"
| 2018-10-22|| Win||align=left|  Tan Xiaofeng ||Kunlun Fight 78 75 kg Tournament, Quarter Finals|| China || TKO||  ||
|-  bgcolor= "#FFBBBB"
| 2018-08-05|| Loss||align=left| Jonatan Oliveira ||ACB KB-17  || Russia || TKO (Referee Stoppage/Right Cross) || 2 || 0:33
|-  bgcolor= "#FFBBBB"
| 2018-02-03|| Loss||align=left|  Zhang Yang ||kunlun Fight 69  || China || Extra Round Decision || 4 || 3:00
|-  style="background:#CCFFCC;"
| 2017-11-05|| Win||align=left|  Hossein Karami ||Kunlun Fight 66 75 kg Championship Final  || China || Decision || 3 || 3:00
|-
! style=background:white colspan=9 |
|-  style="background:#CCFFCC;"
| 2017-11-05|| Win||align=left|  Arthit Hanchana ||Kunlun Fight 66 75 kg Championship Final 4 || China || TKO ||  ||
|-  style="background:#CCFFCC;"
| 2017-11-05|| Win||align=left|  Nurla Mulali ||Kunlun Fight 66 75 kg Championship Final 8 || China || Decision (Unanimous) || 3 || 3:00
|-  bgcolor="#CCFFCC"
| 2017-06-10 || Win ||align=left| Nurla Mulali || Kunlun Fight 62 || Bangkok, Thailand || Decision (Unanimous) || 3 || 3:00
|-  bgcolor="#CCFFCC"
| 2016-12-11|| Win ||align=left|  Mergen Bilyalov || PFC Silk Road Hero 2016|| Chongqing, China || Decision (Unanimous) || 3 || 3:00
|-  bgcolor="#CCFFCC"
| 2014-03-08 || Win ||align=left| Jaseem Al Djilwi || Kickboxing Empire II || Las Vegas, Nevada, USA || TKO (right knee to the body and punches) || 3 || 2:06
|-
|-  bgcolor="#CCFFCC"
| 2014-01-25 || Win ||align=left| Kem Sitsongpeenong || Ring Wars || Milan, Italy || Decision || 5 || 3:00
|-
! style=background:white colspan=9 |

|-  bgcolor= "#FFBBBB"
| 2012-12-16 || Loss ||align=left| Buakaw Banchamek || THAI FIGHT 2012: Finals, 70 kg Tournament Final || Thailand || Decision || 3 || 3:00
|-
|-  bgcolor="#CCFFCC"
| 2012-11-25 || Win ||align=left| Antero Hynynen || THAI FIGHT 2012: 2nd Round, 70 kg Tournament Semi Finals || Nakhon Ratchasima, Thailand || || ||
|-
|-  bgcolor="#CCFFCC"
| 2012-10-23 || Win ||align=left| Fares Bechar || THAI FIGHT 2012: 1st Round, 70 kg Tournament Quarter Finals || Bangkok, Thailand || Decision || 3 || 3:00
|-
|-  bgcolor= "#FFBBBB"
| 2012-06-28 || Loss ||align=left| Shamil Abdulmedzhidov || Dictator FC || Moscow, Russia || Decision (Unanimous) || 3 || 3:00
|-
|-  bgcolor="#FFBBBB"
| 2010-10-25 || Loss ||align=left| Petchmankong Petchfocus || THAI FIGHT Final 8 || Bangkok, Thailand || Decision (Unanimous) || 5 || 3:00
|-
! style=background:white colspan=9 |
|-
|-  bgcolor="#FFBBBB"
| 2010-10-03 || Loss ||align=left| Giorgio Petrosyan || K-1 World MAX 2010 Final 16 - Part 2 || Seoul, South Korea || Decision (Unanimous) || 3 || 3:00 
|-
! style=background:white colspan=9 |
|-
|-  bgcolor="#CCFFCC"
| 2010-08-29 || Win ||align=left| Jong Hyun Ko || THAI FIGHT Final 16 || Bangkok, Thailand || TKO (Referee Stoppage) || 3 ||
|-
! style=background:white colspan=9 |
|-  bgcolor="#CCFFCC"
| 2010-03-19 || Win ||align=left| Zamin Guseynov || K-1 World MAX 2010 East Europe Tournament, Final || Minsk, Belarus || Decision (Unanimous) || 3 || 3:00
|-
! style=background:white colspan=9 |
|-
|-  bgcolor="#CCFFCC"
| 2010-03-19 || Win ||align=left| Enriko Gogokhia || K-1 World MAX 2010 East Europe Tournament, Semi Finals || Minsk, Belarus || Ext.R Decision (Unanimous) || 4 || 3:00
|-
|-  bgcolor="#CCFFCC"
| 2010-03-19 || Win ||align=left| Lukasz Szul || K-1 World MAX 2010 East Europe Tournament, Quarter Finals || Minsk, Belarus || Decision (Unanimous) || 3 || 3:00 
|-
|-  bgcolor="#FFBBBB"
| 2009-10-23 || Loss ||align=left| Uranbek Esenkulov || Tatneft Cup 2009, Final || Kazan, Russia || Decision || 6 || 3:00 
|-
! style=background:white colspan=9 |
|-
|-  bgcolor="#CCFFCC"
| 2009-09-16 || Win ||align=left| Armen Israelyan || Tatneft Cup 2009, Semi Finals || Kazan, Russia || Decision || 4 || 3:00 
|-
|-  bgcolor="#CCFFCC"
| 2009-05-26 || Win ||align=left| Vladimir Shakaya || Tatneft Cup 2009 2nd Selection, Quarter Finals || Kazan, Russia || TKO (Knee to Body) || 2 || 
|-
|-  bgcolor="#CCFFCC"
| 2009-02-19 || Win ||align=left| Andrey Khovrin || Tatneft Cup 2009 4th Selection, 1st Round || Kazan, Russia || Decision || 4 || 3:00 
|-
|-  bgcolor="#FFBBBB"
| 2008-12-19 || Loss ||align=left| Artem Levin || "The Contender Asia" Season 2 Russia Super 8 Qualifier, Final || Chelyabinsk, Russia || TKO (Cut) || 1 || 3:00 
|-
! style=background:white colspan=9 |
|-
|-  bgcolor="#CCFFCC"
| 2008-12-19 || Win ||align=left| Petr Nakonechnyi || "The Contender Asia" Season 2 Russia Super 8 Qualifier, Semi Finals || Chelyabinsk, Russia || Decision (Unanimous) || 3 || 3:00 
|-
|-  bgcolor="#CCFFCC"
| 2008-12-19 || Win ||align=left| Mickael Piscitello || "The Contender Asia" Season 2 Russia Super 8 Qualifier, Quarter Finals || Chelyabinsk, Russia || Decision || 3 || 3:00
|-  bgcolor="#CCFFCC"
| 2007-03-25 || Win ||align=left| Greg Foley || W.M.C. Brute Force 8 Judgement Day, Final || Melbourne, Australia || Decision (Unanimous) || 3 || 3:00
|-
! style=background:white colspan=9 |
|-
|-  bgcolor="#CCFFCC"
| 2007-03-25 || Win ||align=left| Jason Scerri || W.M.C. Brute Force 8 Judgement Day, Semi Finals || Melbourne, Australia || Decision (Unanimous) || 3 || 3:00
|-
|-  bgcolor="#CCFFCC"
| 2007-03-25 || Win ||align=left| Marcin Olczak || W.M.C. Brute Force 8 Judgement Day, Quarter Finals || Melbourne, Australia || Decision (Unanimous) || 3 || 3:00
|-  bgcolor="#CCFFCC"
| 2006-12-02 || Win ||align=left| Jak Nakrantong || || Perth, Australia || Decision || 5 || 2:00
|-  bgcolor="#FFBBBB"
| 2006-07-26 || Loss ||align=left| Maxim Grechkin || S-1 European Championships: Tsunami 2, semi final || Kaliningrad, Russia || Decision (Unanimous) || 3 || 3:00
|-  bgcolor="#CCFFCC"
| 2006-07-26 || Win ||align=left| Dzhabar Askerov || S-1 European Championships: Tsunami 2, quarter final || Kaliningrad, Russia || Decision (Unanimous) || 3 || 3:00
|-
|-  bgcolor="#CCFFCC"
| 2004-10-26 || Win ||align=left| Tagir Magomedov || Russian Muaythai League event || Moscow, Russia || KO || 4 ||
|-
|-
|-
| colspan=9 | Legend:    

|-  bgcolor="#CCFFCC"
| 2017-07-29 || Win ||align=left| Vasyl Sorokin || I.F.M.A. World Games 2017, Finals -75 kg || Wroclaw, Poland || Decision ||  || 
|-
! style=background:white colspan=9 |
|-  bgcolor="#CCFFCC"
| 2017-07-29 || Win ||align=left| Troy Jones || I.F.M.A. World Games 2017, Semi Finals -75 kg || Poland || TKO || 3 ||
|-  bgcolor="#CCFFCC"
| 2017-07-28 || Win ||align=left| Diogo Calado || I.F.M.A. World Games 2017, Quarter Finals -75 kg || Poland || Decision || 3 ||
|-

|-  style="background:#fbb;"
| 2017-05-08|| Loss ||align=left| Diogo Calado || 2017 IFMA World Championships, Quarter Final ||Minsk, Belarus || Decision (29:28)|| 3 ||

|-  bgcolor="#CCFFCC"
| 2016-05-29 || Win ||align=left| Ekkapan Somboonsab || I.F.M.A. World Muaythai Championships 2016, Finals -75 kg || Jönköping, Sweden || Decision (Unanimous) || 3 || 2:00
|-
! style=background:white colspan=9 |

|-  bgcolor="#cfc"
| 2014-09- || Win||align=left| Vitali Nikiforov || 2014 IFMA European Championships, Final|| Krakow, Poland || Decision || 3 || 3:00
|-
! style=background:white colspan=9 |

|-  bgcolor="#cfc"
| 2014-09- || Win ||align=left| Vasily Semenov || 2014 IFMA European Championships, Semi Finals|| Krakow, Poland || Decision || 3 || 3:00

|-  bgcolor="#cfc"
| 2014-09- || Win ||align=left| Ismail Cevikbas || 2014 IFMA European Championships, Quarter Finals|| Krakow, Poland || Decision || 3 || 3:00

|-  style="background:#fbb;"
| 2013-10-23 || Loss||align=left| Zaynalabid Magomedov || 2013 World Combat Games, Final || Bangkok, Thailand || Decision ||  || 
|-
! style=background:white colspan=9 |

|-  style="background:#cfc;"
| 2013-10-21 || Win ||align=left|   || 2013 World Combat Games, Semi Final || Bangkok, Thailand || Decision ||  ||

|-  style="background:#cfc;"
| 2013-07-|| Win ||align=left| Alim Nabiev || 2013 IFMA European Championship, Final || Lisbon, Portugal || Decision  || 4 || 2:00
|-
! style=background:white colspan=8 |

|-  bgcolor="#fbb"
| 2012-09- || Loss||align=left| Zaynalabid Magomedov || I.F.M.A. World Muaythai Championships 2012, Final || Saint Petersburg, Russia || Decision || 4 || 2:00
|-
! style=background:white colspan=9 |

|-  bgcolor="#CCFFCC"
| 2012-09-11 || Win ||align=left| Kem Sitsongpeenong || I.F.M.A. World Muaythai Championships 2012, Semi Finals || Saint Petersburg, Russia || Decision (Majority) || 4 || 2:00
|-
|-  bgcolor="#cfc"
| 2012-09-10 || Win ||align=left| Enriko Gogokhia || I.F.M.A. World Muaythai Championships 2012, Quarter Finals|| Saint Petersburg, Russia || Decision ||  || 

|-  style="background:#fbb;"
| 2012-05-23 || Loss ||align=left| Zaynalabid Magomedov || 2012 IFMA European Championships, Final || Antalya, Turkey || Decision || 4 || 2:00
|-
! style=background:white colspan=9 |

|-  bgcolor="#CCFFCC"
| 2011-09-27 || Win ||align=left| Konstantin Khuzin || I.F.M.A. World Championships 2011, Final -71 kg || Tashkent, Uzbekistan || Decision || 4 || 2:00 
|-
! style=background:white colspan=9 |
|-
|-  bgcolor="#CCFFCC"
| 2011-09-25 || Win ||align=left| Enriko Gogokhia || I.F.M.A. World Championships 2011, Semi finals -71 kg ||  Tashkent, Uzbekistan  || Decision || 4 || 2:00 
|-
|-  bgcolor="#CCFFCC"
| 2011-09-24 || Win ||align=left| Direk Thongnoon || I.F.M.A. World Championships 2011, Quarter Finals -71 kg ||  Tashkent, Uzbekistan  || Decision || 4 || 2:00 
|-

|-  bgcolor="#c5d2ea"
| 2010-12-05 ||NC||align=left| Magomedov Zaynalabin || I.F.M.A. World Championships 2010, Final -71 kg || Bangkok, Thailand ||No Contest || || 
|-
! style=background:white colspan=9 |
|-
|-  bgcolor="#CCFFCC"
| 2010-05-30 || Win ||align=left| Almaz Smagulov || I.F.M.A. European Muaythai Championships 2010, Final -71 kg || Velletri, Italy || || || 
|-
! style=background:white colspan=9 |
|-
|-  bgcolor="#CCFFCC"
| 2010-05-29 || Win ||align=left| Ismail || I.F.M.A. European Muaythai Championships 2010, Semi Final -71 kg || Velletri, Italy || || || 
|-
|-  bgcolor="#CCFFCC"
| 2010-05-28 || Win ||align=left| Viktor Zaman || I.F.M.A. European Muaythai Championships 2010, Quarter Final -71 kg || Velletri, Italy || || || 
|-
|-  bgcolor="#CCFFCC"
| 2010-05-27 || Win ||align=left| Mathias Karlsson || I.F.M.A. European Muaythai Championships 2010, 1st Round -71 kg || Velletri, Italy || || || 
|-
|-  bgcolor="#CCFFCC"
| 2009-12-05 || Win ||align=left| Almas Smagulov || I.F.M.A. World Championships 2009, Final -71 kg || Bangkok, Thailand || || || 
|-
! style=background:white colspan=9 |
|-
|-  bgcolor="#CCFFCC"
| 2009-12-? || Win ||align=left| Petr Nakonechnyi || I.F.M.A. World Championships 2009, Semi Finals -71 kg || Bangkok, Thailand || Decision || 4 || 2:00 
|-
|-  bgcolor="#CCFFCC"
| 2009-11-29 || Win ||align=left| Marcus Öberg || I.F.M.A. World Championships 2009, Quarter Finals -71 kg || Bangkok, Thailand || Decision || 4 || 2:00 
|-
|-  bgcolor="#CCFFCC"
| 2009-05-? || Win ||align=left| Konstantin Khuzin || I.F.M.A. European Championships 2009, Final -71 kg || Liepāja, Latvia || || || 
|-
! style=background:white colspan=9 |
|-
|-  bgcolor="#CCFFCC"
| 2009-05-? || Win ||align=left| Viktor Zaman || I.F.M.A. European Championships 2009, Semi Finals -71 kg || Liepāja, Latvia || || || 
|-
|-  bgcolor="#CCFFCC"
| 2009-05-? || Win ||align=left| Barnabas Szucs || I.F.M.A. European Championships 2009, Quarter Finals -71 kg || Liepāja, Latvia || || || 
|-
|-  bgcolor="#CCFFCC"
| 2009-05-? || Win ||align=left| Almas Smagulov || I.F.M.A. European Championships 2009, 1st Round -71 kg || Liepāja, Latvia || || ||
|-  bgcolor="#CCFFCC"
| 2008-10-02 || Win ||align=left| Petr Nakonechnyi || 4th Busan TAFISA World Games, Final -71 kg || Busan, Korea || || ||
|-
! style=background:white colspan=9 |
|-
|-  bgcolor="#CCFFCC"
| 2008-09-30 || Win ||align=left| Nariman Satiyev || 4th Busan TAFISA World Games, Semi Finals -71 kg || Busan, Korea || || || 
|-
|-  bgcolor="#CCFFCC"
| 2007-03-11 || Win ||align=left| Shane Campbell || W.M.F. World Championships 2007, Final || Bangkok, Thailand || || ||
|-
! style=background:white colspan=9 |
|-
|-  bgcolor="#CCFFCC"
| 2006-03-26 || Win ||align=left| Alexander Morev || W.M.F. World Championships 2006, Final || Bangkok, Thailand || || ||
|-
! style=background:white colspan=9 |
|-
|-  bgcolor="#CCFFCC"
| 2006-03-24 || Win ||align=left| Adem Bozkurt || W.M.F. World Championships 2006, Semi Finals -67 kg || Bangkok, Thailand || || ||
|-
|-  bgcolor="#CCFFCC"
| 2006-11-26 || Win ||align=left| Nikolay Bubnov || W.A.K.O. European Championships 2006, Thai-Boxing Final -67 kg || Skopje, Macedonia || Decision (Unanimous) || 3 || 2:00
|-
! style=background:white colspan=9 |
|-
|-  bgcolor="#CCFFCC"
| 2006-11-25 || Win ||align=left| Mikhail Mishin || W.A.K.O. European Championships 2006, Thai-Boxing Semi Final -67 kg || Skopje, Macedonia || || ||
|-
|-  bgcolor="#CCFFCC"
| 2006-11-24 || Win ||align=left| Piotr Kobylanski || W.A.K.O. European Championships 2006, Thai-Boxing Quarter Final -67 kg || Skopje, Macedonia || Decision (Unanimous) || 3 || 2:00
|-
|-  bgcolor="#CCFFCC"
| 2006-11-23 || Win ||align=left| Ramil Nadirov || W.A.K.O. European Championships 2006, Thai-Boxing 1st Round -67 kg || Skopje, Macedonia || Decision (Unanimous) || 3 || 2:00
|-
|-
|-  bgcolor="#CCFFCC"
| 2003-03-12 || Win ||align=left| Nuno Neves || I.A.M.T.F. 6th World Championships 2003, Final -61 kg || Bangkok, Thailand || || ||
|-
! style=background:white colspan=9 |
|-
|-
| colspan=9 | Legend''':

See also
List of male kickboxers
List of K-1 events

References

External links

Gurkov Vitaly (Minsk, Belarus) - FightLife.ru

Belarusian male kickboxers
Welterweight kickboxers
Belarusian Muay Thai practitioners
Sportspeople from Minsk
1985 births
Living people
Kunlun Fight kickboxers
Kunlun Fight kickboxing champions